Glenaubyn is a rural locality in the Western Downs Region, Queensland, Australia. In the  Glenaubyn had a population of 48 people.

History 
Wallan Creek Upper Provisional School opened on 22 February 1915. On 1 June 1923 it became Glenaubyn State School. It closed on 14 March 1975. The school was on the north-east corner of the junction of Glenaubyn Road and Dunns Road.

In the  Glenaubyn had a population of 48 people.

References 

Western Downs Region
Localities in Queensland